William Patrick Fraser (born May 26, 1964) is an American former professional baseball pitcher. Fraser played for the California Angels, Toronto Blue Jays, St. Louis Cardinals, Florida Marlins, and Montreal Expos. Following his major league career, he played for three seasons with the Orix BlueWave in Japan's Nippon Professional Baseball (NPB).

Career
Fraser grew up a New York Yankees fan in Newburgh, New York, and graduated from Newburgh Free Academy in 1982. He played college baseball in NCAA Division II at Concordia College in Bronxville, New York, where he developed a forkball which drew comparisons to future Hall of Famer Bruce Sutter's. The California Angels selected him with the fifteenth pick in the 1985 MLB draft, ahead of future Hall of Famers Randy Johnson and John Smoltz. He was assigned to the Quad Cities Angels of the Midwest League to begin his professional career.

Fraser made his Major League debut in a start with the Angels on September 10, 1986, at Cleveland Stadium against the Indians. It was his only Major League appearance that year. Blyleven spent most of the next two seasons in the starting rotation but was moved to the bullpen after the Angels traded for future Hall of Fame pitcher Bert Blyleven following the 1988 season. He had led the league in home runs allowed in 1988.

After two years in California's bullpen, Fraser was traded to Toronto with Marcus Moore and Devon White in exchange for Junior Félix, Luis Sojo and a player to be named later. Fraser pitched in thirteen games for the Blue Jays before being placed on waivers and picked up by the St. Louis Cardinals where he finished the 1991 season. He spent all of 1992 and 1993 in Triple-A with the Edmonton Trappers and Toledo Mud Hens respectively. He returned to the majors in each of the following years with nine appearances for the Florida Marlins in 1994 and twenty-two with the Montreal Expos in 1995.

In 1996, Fraser began a three-year stint in Nippon Professional Baseball as a key addition to the Orix BlueWave. He won the second-most games for the club en route to a 1996 Japan Series victory led by Troy Neel and Ichiro Suzuki. He played in his last professional game on September 24, 1998, in Japan for Orix. 

After retirement, Fraser worked for an independent company scouting players in Japan and the United States. He then became an advance scout for the Angels and, in 2014, began working as an advance scout for the Los Angeles Dodgers. In 2018, he was working as a scout for the Miami Marlins and conducting baseball clinics for children in places such as the Pine Ridge Indian Reservation in South Dakota, Ireland and Honduras. , he was a scout for the Chicago Cubs. The Cubs parted ways with Fraser following the 2021 season.

Personal life
, Fraser lived in Hopewell Junction, New York. He and his wife, Jeannie, have two adult sons.

References

External links

1964 births
Living people
American expatriate baseball players in Canada
American expatriate baseball players in Japan
Baseball players from New York (state)
California Angels players
Chicago Cubs scouts
Concordia Clippers baseball players
Edmonton Trappers players
Florida Marlins players
Los Angeles Angels of Anaheim scouts
Los Angeles Dodgers scouts
Major League Baseball pitchers
Miami Marlins scouts
Montreal Expos players
Nippon Professional Baseball pitchers
Orix BlueWave players
Ottawa Lynx players
Palm Springs Angels players
Parma Baseball Club players
Quad Cities Angels players
Sportspeople from Newburgh, New York
St. Louis Cardinals players
Syracuse Chiefs players
Toledo Mud Hens players
Toronto Blue Jays players
Newburgh Free Academy alumni